Munjarin Mahbub Abony is a Bangladeshi model, social activist and a dancer. She won the first beauty pageant in Bangladesh ‘’’Mrs. World Bangladesh 2019’’’, where all the contestants were married women. She represented Bangladesh at the Mrs World contest held in Las Vegas, U.S.

Education
Munjarin Mahbub Abony completed her Bachelor of Social Science degree in mechanical engineering under the Ahsanullah University of Science and Technology.

Career
Abony is a model. She debuted her modeling career in media through an advertisement of Grameen Phone. She contested in World Miss University 2016 in China as a peace ambassador. In the year 2019 Abony participated and won the first ever Mrs Bangladesh title.  She had been the brand ambassador of Walton home appliance.

Social activities
Munjarin is a social activist as well as a dancer by profession. She owns a dance school where she gives dancing lesson to differently able children. As an ambassador of Mrs World organization, she visited many countries to serve underprivileged children and old people.

Awards and nominations

References

Living people
1994 births
Ahsanullah University of Science and Technology alumni
Bangladeshi beauty pageant winners